The Bulle–Broc railway line is a railway line in the canton of Fribourg, Switzerland. It was built in 1912 by the Chemins de fer électriques de la Gruyère (CEG) as a branch from the Palézieux–Bulle–Montbovon railway line. Transports publics Fribourgeois (TPF) closed the line in 2021 for rebuilding as a standard gauge line, which will permit through operation over the Bulle–Romont railway line.

History 
The Chemins de fer électriques de la Gruyère constructed the branch line in 1912, with the section from Bulle to Les Marches opening on 29 January and from Les Marches to Broc on 24 June. In 1942, the CEG merged with two other companies to form the Chemins de fer fribourgeois Gruyère–Fribourg–Morat (GFM). The GFM, in turn, became the Transports publics Fribourgeois (TPF) in 2000.

Two stations were renamed with the 2017 timetable change: La Tour-Village became La Tour-de-Trême while Epagny became La Tour-de-Trême Parqueterie. The station formerly known as La Tour-de-Trême on the Palézieux–Bulle–Montbovon line became La Tour-de-Trême Ronclina.

TPF closed the line in April 2021 to permit a complete rebuilding and conversion to standard gauge. Two other stations, La Tour-de-Trême Parqueterie and Les Marches, were closed. The line is scheduled for reopening in 2023.

Notes

References 
 

Railway lines in Switzerland
Metre gauge railways in Switzerland
Transport in the canton of Fribourg
Railway lines opened in 1912